Afro Nation is an annual three-day music festival produced by Live Nation, Event Horizon, Smade Entertainment, and Memories of Tomorrow. The festival was founded by Obi Asika, and Smade, in association with BBC 1 Xtra, in 2013. The platform was established to bring together the best African artist in Afrobeats, Hip hop, RnB, Dancehall, Amapiano, Afro House and more. The festival was nominated in the Best Overseas Festival category at the 2019 UK Festival Awards.

History
On 1 August 2019, Afro Nation (also marketed as Afro Nation Puerto Rico, Afro Nation U.S, Afro Nation Ghana, and Afro Nation Mexico) was founded by Obi Asika, and Smade. The event was established as a four-day annual music festival in Portimão, Portugal, till 17 July 2020, the festival began operating as a three-day annual event. Shortly after, the second edition was postponed to 1 July 2022, due to the outbreak of Coronavirus. On 13 December 2019, Afro Nation released its compilation mixtape curated by MOVES Recordings, titled Afro Nation, Vol. 1. The album features guest appearance from SMADE, Ice Prince, Slim Kofi, Lighter Tod, Joey B, Kuami Eugene, Medikal, Eddie Kadi, Bisa Kdei, Adekunle Gold, Oxlade, Reekado Banks, Eugy, Br3nya, and Terry Apala.

List of Afro Nation Festivals
Afro Nation U.S
Afro Nation Ghana
Afro Nation Puerto Rico
Afro Nation Mexico
Afro Nation Portugal

Performers
The festival was launched in 2019, and has featured various guest performances from  Wizkid, Davido, Burna Boy, Busy Signal, Femi Kuti, Adekunle Gold, Afro B, B Young, Distruction Boyz, Hardy Caprio, King Promise, Maleek Berry, Mist, Mostack, Ms Dynamite, Not3s, NSG, Octavian, Stefflon Don, Teni, The Compozers, Vanessa Mdee, Laycon, and Yxng Bane. In its 2022 line-up, it featured Meek Mill, Megan Thee Stallion, Beenie Man, C4 Pedro, CKay, Dadju, Diamond Platnumz, Ding Dong, Innoss'B, KiDi, Kizz Daniel, Koffee, Kuami Eugene, Black Sherif , Tiwa Savage, Gyakie, Maître Gims, Naira Marley, Nelson Freitas, Niniola, Patoranking, R2Bees, Reekado Banks, Rema, Ruger, Small Doctor, Sona, Tekno, Tems, and Wande Coal.

Radio Shows

Official UK Afrobeats Chart Show
On 26 September 2021, Afro Nation and Official Charts Company founded the official weekly UK Afrobeats Chart Show on BBC Radio 1 Xtra, with host Eddie Kadi.

Music Charts
U.S Afrobeats Songs Chart - (An Afrobeat chart founded by Billboard and Afro Nation, in 2022)
UK Afrobeats Singles Chart - (An Afrobeat chart founded by Official Charts Company and Afro Nation, in 2020)

Discography

Mixtapes

References

External links 
Afro Nation Mexico 
Afro Nation Ghana

Festivals in Portugal
2019 establishments in Portugal
Music festivals in Portugal
Festivals established in 2019